Universal's Volcano Bay Water Theme Park, or Volcano Bay, is a tropical-themed water park at Universal Orlando Resort in Orlando, Florida. Owned and operated by Universal Destinations & Experiences, Volcano Bay replaced Wet 'n Wild as Universal Orlando Resort's water park, and it was the first water park constructed by Universal itself. The park, themed around a  volcano named "Krakatau", opened on May 25, 2017.

The volcano houses three drop-capsule slides, Ko'okiri Body Plunge, the tallest body slide in America ranging at 125 feet tall, and also the first to travel through a pool full of guests. Krakatau also holds the Kala & Tai Nui Serpentine Body Slides which travel throughout the midst of the volcano, winding around the Krakatau Aqua Coaster.

The park uses a wearable under the name TapuTapu for payments and line queues. The wearable is distributed at the entrance at the park, which can be used to hold one's place in line. TapuTapu allows for payment by linking a credit card through the Universal Orlando app to the wearable, allowing users to pay throughout the park for merchandise, food, and drinks. The wristbands can be used to interact with environmental features, set off water springs, or illuminate lights.

History
In February 2015, Universal Orlando Resort officials submitted plans for a new water park attraction to be located on their property near the Cabana Bay Beach Resort. Construction was already underway when Universal Orlando Resort officially announced the project, and its name, on May 28, 2015. In June 2015, it was revealed that the park would replace the Universal-owned Wet 'n Wild water park, which closed on December 31, 2016.

Artist's concepts showed a thrill slide coming from the park's central volcano, as well as a wave pool and other water slides. A lazy river and rapids slide are also shown on the plans, although park officials stated they will reveal all of the park's planned attractions at a later date.

On June 21, 2016, Universal Orlando Resort officials revealed additional details on Volcano Bay, including its debut attractions and its planned opening date of June 1, 2017. On January 25, 2017, Universal Orlando Resort revealed that the Grand Opening ceremony would be on May 25, 2017.

On May 25, 2017, Volcano Bay officially opened to the public.

Attractions
Volcano Bay's attractions are located in four themed areas, each inspired by various Polynesian islands and cultures. The centerpiece of the park is "Krakatau", a  volcano that will have waterfalls during the day and lava flows at night created by the French company Aquatique Show.

Krakatau
The area located in the park's signature volcano also includes a first-of-its-kind slide attraction.
 Krakatau Aqua Coaster: A water coaster taking riders inside the heart of the Krakatau volcano, before plunging through a shimmering waterfall. It features linear induction motors to propel riders uphill.
 Ko’okiri Body Plunge: A near-vertical (70-degree drop) speed slide with a trap-door start that passes through the Krakatau volcano, falling . The slide will also pass through one of the pool attractions at the base of the volcano, described by the park as a "world's-first" feature. Along with the Kala and Tai Nui Serpentine Body Slides, Ko'okiri Body Plunge is the tallest drop capsule slide in the world. It is also the tallest body slide in the world to send riders out of a drop capsule the entire height of the slide in one continuous descent.
 Kala and Tai Nui Serpentine Body Slides: A pair of high-speed twisting body slides with trap-door starts. Along with the Ko'okiri Body Plunge, Kala and Tai Nui Serpentine Body Slides are the tallest drop capsule slides in the world at 125 ft.
 Punga Racers: A four-lane racing body slides (formerly the attraction used mats).

Wave Village
Wave Village is designed for sunbathing and relaxation and includes one and two-story cabanas that can be rented by visitors.
 Waturi Beach: The park's main wave pool.
 The Reef: A calmer pool with fewer waves.
 Ohyah and Ohno Drop Slides: Body slides with tall drops into the splash pools.
 Puka Uli Lagoon: A pool intended for relaxation.

River Village

The River Village area contains attractions for families and for younger visitors.
 Kopiko Wai Winding River: A lazy river that passes through Krakatau, with decorated caves and random special effects.
 Tot Tiki Reef: A play area designed for toddlers.
 Runamukka Reef: Three stories tall, a water fortress with its own small slides.
 Honu: One of two slides with multi-passenger rafts which sweeps riders up two massive walls.
 Ika Moana: A second multi-passenger raft slide.

Rainforest Village

The final section of the park contains a large number of thrill slides, including raft slides ridden with multiple riders.
 Maku: Another multi-passenger raft slide, described as the first of its kind in North America with three high-banked "saucer" elements.
 Puihi: Multi-passenger rafts drop into multiple tunnels, then two funnels and a final drop.
 TeAwa The Fearless River: A raft ride simulating white-water rafting.
 Taniwha Tubes: Four raft slides ridden solo or in pairs.

Reception
Volcano Bay's first few months of operation were met with mixed reviews on social media sites such as Yelp and TripAdvisor, with visitors praising the park's appearance and theming, while criticizing the lines and the TapuTapu ride reservation system. Visitors complained about the long lines for the slides that could be reserved, which they say resulted in overcrowding in attractions that could not be reserved. However, other visitors noted that they had better experiences arriving well before opening or later in the day. A park spokesperson claimed that their internal surveys indicated guests were generally happy with the park, but that they were continuously improving the product.

In popular culture
The park appeared in season 6, episode 23 of the truTV television show Impractical Jokers, “Take Me Out at the Ballgame”. Additionally, the park has also appeared in season 14 of Food Network's show Food Network Star, as well as Top Chef Junior season 1, episode 13.

References

External links

Water parks in Florida
Tourist attractions in Greater Orlando
Amusement parks opened in 2017
Universal Orlando
2017 establishments in Florida